Maksim Valentinovich Schastlivtsev (born 10 May 1986) is a Russian former professional football player.

Club career
He made his Russian Football National League debut for FC SKA-Energiya Khabarovsk on 5 May 2006 in a game against FC Angusht Nazran.

External links
 

1986 births
People from Birobidzhan
Living people
Russian footballers
Association football goalkeepers
FC Okean Nakhodka players
FC Dynamo Barnaul players
FC SKA-Khabarovsk players
FC Sakhalin Yuzhno-Sakhalinsk players
FC Chita players